Victor Alexandrovich Kolyvagin (born 11 March, 1955) is a Russian mathematician who wrote a series of papers on Euler systems, leading to breakthroughs on the Birch and Swinnerton-Dyer conjecture, and Iwasawa's conjecture for cyclotomic fields. His work also influenced Andrew Wiles's work on Fermat's Last Theorem.

Career
Kolyvagin received his Ph.D. in Mathematics in 1981 from Moscow State University, where his advisor was Yuri I. Manin.  He then worked at Steklov Institute of Mathematics in Moscow until 1994. Since 1994 he has been a professor of mathematics in the United States. He was a professor at Johns Hopkins University until 2002 when he became the first person to hold the Mina Rees Chair in mathematics at the Graduate Center Faculty at The City University of New York.

Awards
In 1990 he received the Chebyshev Prize of the USSR Academy of Sciences.

References

Link 
 
 Kolyvagin's Biography

1955 births
Living people
Johns Hopkins University faculty
City University of New York faculty
Graduate Center, CUNY faculty
Russian emigrants to the United States
20th-century American mathematicians
21st-century American mathematicians
Number theorists
Russian mathematicians
Moscow State University alumni